Belogorsk is a town in Amur Oblast, Russia, located on the river Tom, a tributary of the Zeya. Population:    53,000 (1969); 34,000 (1939).

The town was included in a list of towns at risk of social problems, including poverty and corruption. It was previously known as Alexandrovskoye (until 1926), Alexandrovsk (until 1931), Krasnopartizansk (until 1935), Kuybyshevka Vostochnaya (until 1957).

History
The selo of Alexandrovskoye was founded in 1860 by the settlers from the European part of Russia. In 1893, the selo of Bochkaryovka appeared nearby. The two localities grew with the construction of a station on the Trans-Siberian Railway in 1913, and by 1923 Alexandrovskoye and Bochkarevka merged and were transformed into Alexandrovsk. Town status was granted to Alexandrovsk in 1926. In 1931, it was renamed Krasnopartizansk, then, in 1935, Kuybyshevka-Vostochnaya, to commemorate the Soviet statesman Valerian Kuybyshev. In 1957, possibly to reduce the number of localities named after Kuybyshev, the town was given its present name. While the literal meaning of the name is white mountains, the reasons for renaming are unclear, as the town stands on a plain with no "white mountains" anywhere in the vicinity. It is possible, however, that the name was due to the whitish color of the quartz sands of the bluffs on the Tom River, or that it was allegorical, with the meaning of a white town.

Climate
This record was beaten two days later in Ust-Karsk.

Administrative and municipal status
Within the framework of administrative divisions, Belogorsk serves as the administrative center of Belogorsky District, even though it is not a part of it. As an administrative division, it is, together with one rural locality (the selo of Nizinnoye), incorporated separately as Belogorsk Urban Okrug—an administrative unit with the status equal to that of the districts. As a municipal division, this administrative unit also has urban okrug status.

Economy
Belogorsk is a center for food production, as well as construction products.

Military
The town is home to important military elements of the Eastern Military District, specifically the headquarters of the 35th Army and the 21st Guards Motor Rifle Division. Nearby is the Ukrainka air base, home to elements of Long Range Aviation.

Notable people
Sergei Chukhray (born 1955), Soviet sprint canoer
Svetlana Klyuka (born 1978), Russian middle distance runner
Victor Nechayev (born 1955), professional ice hockey player
Valeriy Priyomykhov (1943–2000), Soviet and Russian actor, film director, screenwriter and author
Andrey Shary (born 1965), Russian journalist and author

References

Notes

Sources

Е. М. Поспелов (Ye. M. Pospelov). "Имена городов: вчера и сегодня (1917–1992). Топонимический словарь." (City Names: Yesterday and Today (1917–1992). Toponymic Dictionary." Москва, "Русские словари", 1993.

External links
Official website of Belogorsk 
Directory of organizations in Belogorsk 

Cities and towns in Amur Oblast
Populated places established in 1860